Hakea chromatropa is a species of shrub found in Southwest Australia. The distribution is restricted to an area around Wongan Hills, where it is found on gravelly loam in open shrubland. The flowers are white or creamy, becoming pink, and without a scent.

Description
Small branches are covered with short forked matted hairs and longer simple hairs. The edge of the leaf has definite "teeth" widening toward the apex, 1–5 teeth or entire terminating with a stiff sharp point on each margin. The inflorescence appear in leaf axils with a barely discernible stalk. Each inflorescence has 20-26  unscented creamy-white flowers turning a deep pink with age. The surface is covered with small corky pyramid-shaped protrusions. The flowering period is between July and the beginning of October.

Taxonomy and naming
Hakea chromatropa was first formally described in 2007 by Alex George and Robyn Mary Barker and published in Nuytsia. 17:159-164. The specific epithet (chromatropa) is derived from the Ancient Greek words chroma meaning "colour"   and trope   "a turn" or "a turning"  referring to the species habit of flowers changing colour as they age. The new taxon was described by Alex George and Robyn Barker from dried specimens obtained in 2006 and recorded as having no scent.  However in a television interview, Alex George stated that Hakea chromatropa "has a lovely scent like vanilla".

Distribution and habitat
Hakea chromatropa has a restricted distribution in four localities in the northern Jarrah Forest and north- western Avon Wheatbelt.
Grows in open shrubland with sparse mallee and wandoo eucalyptus woodland on gravelly loam.
The new taxon was described from flowering specimens obtained in 2006.

Conservation status
Hakea chromatropa is listed as "Priority One" by the Government of Western Australia Department of Parks and Wildlife, meaning that it is known from only one or a few locations which are potentially at risk.

References

chromatropa
Eudicots of Western Australia
Plants described in 2007
Taxa named by Alex George
Taxa named by Robyn Mary Barker